Life with the Lyons is a 1954 British comedy film directed by Val Guest and starring Bebe Daniels, Ben Lyon and Barbara Lyon. It was a spin-off from the radio series Life with the Lyons, and the screenplay was based on previous episodes from the show. It was shot at Southall Studios in London with sets designed by the art director Wilfred Arnold.

It was followed in 1955 by The Lyons in Paris.

Premise
The Lyon family attempt to acquire a new house in Marble Arch.

Cast
 Bebe Daniels as Bebe Lyon
 Ben Lyon as Ben Lyon
 Richard Lyon as Richard Lyon
 Barbara Lyon as Barbara Lyon
 Hugh Morton as Mr. Hemingway
 Horace Percival as Mr. Wimple
 Molly Weir as Aggie
 Doris Rogers as Florrie Wainwright
 Gwen Lewis as Mrs. Wimple
 Arthur Hill as Slim Cassidy
 Belinda Lee as Violet Hemingway

Production
The Lyons' contract called for them to receive a percentage of the film's profits.

It was the second time Belinda Lee had worked for Val Guest, the first being her debut in The Runaway Bus.

Reception

Box Office
After the film's successful release, the Lyons began a long-running, BBC television series, also titled Life with the Lyons. The film was made at Southall Studios.

Critical reception
Britmovie called it "a cheap but cheerful romp."

References

External links

Life with the Lyons at TCMDB
Life with the Lyons at BFI
Life with the Lyons a Letterbox DVD

1954 films
1950s English-language films
Films directed by Val Guest
1954 comedy films
Films based on radio series
British comedy films
Films shot at Southall Studios
Hammer Film Productions films
Lippert Pictures films
Films scored by Jack Beaver
Films set in London
Films about families
British black-and-white films
1950s British films